Curtis Senior High School is a public high school located in University Place, Washington. Curtis Senior High School is a part of the University Place School District and the only high school in the district. 

The University Place school district includes most of University Place and portions of Fircrest and Tacoma.

History
The school's namesake comes from the former UPSD Superintendent George R. Curtis. The school opened in 1957 as a joint junior-senior high school at the corner of 40th and Grandview. In 1969, a high school facility was built about 500 yards east of the junior high that then extended up 40th Street. After this, the original site became just a junior high school. In 2009, the original junior high was torn down and a new facility was built about 400 yards northeast of that site.

Academics
Curtis Senior High School offers Advanced Placement classes. The school also offers a Running Start program for juniors and seniors to take classes at local colleges.

Notable alumni
 Beau Baldwin - football head coach, Cal Poly 
 Scott Cairns - poet and Guggenheim Fellow
 Andrea Geubelle - 2016 Summer Olympics track and field, triple jump
 Gary Larson - creator and writer of The Far Side
 Mike Levenseller - professional football wide receiver, played 3 seasons in NFL
 Adrienne Martelli - 2012 Summer Olympics bronze medalist in rowing, women's quadruple sculls
 Singor Mobley - former NFL and Canadian Football League defensive back 
 Isaiah Thomas - NBA point guard, two-time NBA All-Star in 2016 & 2017
 Chuck Arnold - President of the Seattle Seahawks
 Jennifer Cohen - University of Washington Athletic Director 
 Morgan Weaver - professional soccer forward for the Portland Thorns FC

References

High schools in Pierce County, Washington
South Puget Sound League
Public high schools in Washington (state)
Educational institutions established in 1957
1957 establishments in Washington (state)